Cocodrilos de Matanzas (English: Matanzas Crocodiles) are a baseball team in the Cuban National Series. Based in Matanzas Province, the Cocodrilos were formed after the dissolution of Henequeneros and Citricultores, two teams from Matanzas. The Cocodrilos have struggled to enjoy the success of their predecessors.

History 
Long before the Yumurine players wore the Gothic M of Matanzas on their flannels in that year of 1967, the name of such an illustrious city had already adorned the official history of winter tournaments in the mythical campaign of 1878–79.

Like that modest combined at the beginning of the circuit in the nineteenth century, the Matanzas of the 60s and 70s, was not the most competitive. Never, stars of the mood of Wilfredo Sánchez, his brother Fernando, Rigoberto Rosique, Tomás Soto, Evelio Hernández, Edwin Walters, Alfredo García, Gaspar Pérez, Luis Fernández, Ernesto William Alfonso or the brothers Félix and Reinaldo Isasi, could they unify their forces in a single gang to defend the walls of the Athens of Cuba.

And while Matanzas stoically endured his permanence at the bottom of the pond until his total disappearance towards the mid-1970s, Henequeneros, the other squad of the land of crocodiles, adorned his souvenir closet with a trophy in the 1969 campaign -70.

In the early 1990s, the winter series competition system was reorganized for the eighth time. After 19 years of absence, a team reappeared with the name of Matanzas. Although, this second version of the squad in the amateur era was also not very prolific in terms of collective results.

Matanzas won the Cuban National Series championship pennant in 2020, defeating Camagüey in the finals, clinching 4-2 overall in 6 games out of seven.

Roster

Team records

Notable players 
Felix Isasi (second baseman)
Rigoberto Rosique (outfield)
Wilfredo Sanchez (outfield)
Jorge Luis Valdez (pitcher)
Lazaro Junco (outfield)
Julio German Fernandez (first baseman)
Juan Manrrique (catcher)
Jose (pepito) Estrada (outfield)
Yadiel Hernandez (outfield)
Yoandry Garlobo (outfield)
Michel Abreu (first baseman)
Amaury Casañas (outfield)
Guillermo Heredia (outfield)

See also
Matanzas (Cuban League)

References

Baseball teams in Cuba
Matanzas
Baseball teams established in 1992
1992 establishments in Cuba